The 1879–80 season was the seventh season of competitive football in Scotland. This season saw the introduction of the fourth regional competition with the inaugural playing of the Lanarkshire Cup.

Scottish Cup

County honours

Other honours

 After a replay

Teams in F.A. Cup

Scotland national team

References

External links
Scottish Football Historical Archive

 
Seasons in Scottish football